Chris Wesley Walters (born May 1, 1986) is an American politician and a former Republican member of the West Virginia Senate representing District 8 between 2013 and 2017.

Education

Elections
2012 With incumbent Senator Dan Foster redistricted to District 17, and not seeking re-election Walters was unopposed for the District 8 May 8, 2012 Republican Primary, winning with 4,261 votes, and won the November 6, 2012 General election with 19,242 votes (52.8%) against Democratic nominee Joshua Martin.
2010 When House District 44 incumbent Democratic Representative Robert Beach ran for West Virginia Senate and left a seat open, Walters, who was attending West Virginia University at the time, placed second in the six-way May 11, 2010 Republican Primary with 1,923 votes (23.3%), but only placed fifth in the ten-way four-position November 2, 2010 General election behind Representatives Charlene Marshall (D) and Barbara Fleischauer (D), challengers Amanda Pasdon (R) and Anthony Barill (D), and ahead of nominees Stephen Cook (D), Kevin Poe (R), Kevin Patrick (R), Independent Paul Brown, and Libertarian Tad Britch.

References

External links
Official page at the West Virginia Legislature

Chris Walters at Ballotpedia
Chris Walters at the National Institute on Money in State Politics

1986 births
Living people
Politicians from Charleston, West Virginia
Politicians from Morgantown, West Virginia
Republican Party West Virginia state senators
West Virginia University alumni
21st-century American politicians